Cooke's Wagon Road or Cooke's Road was the first wagon road between the Rio Grande and the Colorado River to San Diego, through the Mexican provinces of Nuevo México, Chihuahua, Sonora and Alta California, established by Philip St. George Cooke and the Mormon Battalion, from October 19, 1846 to January 29, 1847 during the Mexican–American War. It became the first of the wagon routes between New Mexico and California that with subsequent modifications before and during the California Gold Rush eventually became known as the Southern Trail or Southern Emigrant Trail.

Cooke and the Mormon Battalion establish the route
On February 22, 1847, Philip St. George Cooke submitted a report of his journey, printed by the U. S. Senate in 1849, as the "Official Journal of Lieutenant Colonel Philip St. George Cooke from Santa Fe, in New Mexico, to San Diego, in Upper California". This report recorded his experience in command of the Mormon Battalion and its expedition to establish the wagon route that soon became known to the Forty-niners and later travelers who followed that route as Cooke's Wagon Road or Cooke's Road. Later in 1878 Cooke wrote a book "The Conquest of New Mexico and California" that covered the journey but in less detail than in his original report.

Cooke's Road began from his last camp on the west bank the Rio Grande "across the river from San Diego", 258 miles southwest of Santa Fe, New Mexico and 29 miles down the river from the camp where Colonel Stephen W. Kearny's Expedition left the Rio Grande, for California, crossing the mountains to the headwaters of the Gila River, which he then followed downstream to its confluence with the Colorado River. Cooke was ordered to take the wagons Kearny could not take with him in the rugged terrain of the New Mexico mountains, and build a wagon road that they could traverse and link it up to his route farther west on the Gila River.

Cooke's road extended westward 433 miles, southwestward through Guadalupe Pass in the Guadalupe Mountains, westward to the San Pedro River, following it northward until turning westward near modern Benson, Arizona to Tucson. From Tucson it crossed the arid desert northwestward to the Gila River, 9 miles east of the Pima Villages, where his route rejoined the Gila Trail of Colonel Kearny.

Subsequent Journey along Kearney's Route 
From his first Camp on the Gila River, Cooke then followed Kearny's Gila Trail route continuing to build a wagon road along the Gila River to the Yuma Crossing of the Colorado River. Following the crossing were 89 miles across the Colorado Desert between the waterholes of Cooke's Wells, Alamo Mocho Well, and Indian Wells, to Carrizo Creek and to the oasis of Vallecito.  After recovering from their crossing came the task of building a wagon road 47 miles up to the San Felipe Valley and over Warner Pass in the Laguna Mountains to Warner's Ranch, overcoming the difficult terrain encountered building their road around Box Canyon. From Warner's the battalion marched on existing roads 58 miles northwest through Aguanga and west to Temecula, then southwest to the San Luis Rey River, and west along the river, past Mission San Luis Rey to the Pacific Ocean. The last march was south to Mission San Diego on El Camino Real.

See also
 Southern Emigrant Trail

References

External links
 Sketch of part of the march & wagon road of Lt. Colonel Cooke, Map, ca. 1847 accessed December 17, 2015), University of North Texas Libraries, The Portal to Texas History, The Portal to Texas History – A gateway to rare, historical, and primary source materials from or about Texas.; crediting University of Texas at Arlington Library, Arlington, Texas.

 
Trails and roads in the American Old West
Arizona Territory
Historic trails and roads in Arizona
History of Baja California
Historic trails and roads in Baja California
History of transportation in California
Historic trails and roads in California
New Mexico Territory
Historic trails and roads in New Mexico
Mormon Battalion